Andover Newton Seminary at Yale Divinity School is an American seminary program  founded in 2017 within Yale Divinity School and located in New Haven, Connecticut. It is the successor institution of Andover Newton Theological School (ANTS), the oldest graduate seminary in the United States and the nation's first graduate institution of any kind.

In November 2015, ANTS, affiliated with the American Baptist Churches USA and the United Church of Christ, announced that it would sell its campus in Newton, Massachusetts and relocate, after a presence of 190 years on that site. In July 2017, ANTS and Yale Divinity School completed a formal affiliation to create Andover Newton Seminary within the Divinity School.

History 

The former Andover Newton Theological School (ANTS) in Newton Center, Massachusetts was a product of a 1965 merger between two schools of theology: Andover Theological Seminary and Newton Theological Institution—although the two institutions had been co-resident on the same campus in Newton Center, Massachusetts since 1931. ANTS took the earlier founding date (1807) of the Andover Theological Seminary for its founding year.

The school created the educational model used by almost all Protestant seminaries today and pioneered many training programs for prospective clergy, including Field Education. Its faculty had historically ranked among the most distinguished in theological education, and its alumni and alumnae have included important abolitionists, educators, clergy, and theologians; three presidents of Brown University; the founding presidents of Wabash College, Grinnell College, and the Union Theological Seminary in New York City; one of the most important presidents of Dartmouth College; and major figures in many areas of American life and culture.

Andover Newton at Yale 
In May 2016, ANTS president Martin Copenhaver announced that Andover Newton would begin a process of formal affiliation with Yale Divinity School over the following two years. In the 2016–17 academic year, a cohort of faculty relocated to New Haven, Connecticut, teaching students and launching pilot initiatives focused on congregational ministry education, while Andover Newton continued to operate in Massachusetts.

The aim of negotiations was a permanent affiliation (beginning in the 2017–18 academic year), resulting in a smaller Andover Newton functioning as a unit within Yale Divinity School, similar to the current arrangement with Berkeley Divinity School. Copenhaver projected that the sale of the Newton, Massachusetts campus would pay off debt and create an endowment for the institution at Yale. On June 29, 2017, the sale of the Andover Newton campus was finalized, and on July 20, 2017, the boards of Andover Newton and Yale Divinity School signed an agreement to formalize their affiliation.

Notes and references

External links 
 
 Description in Yale Divinity School website
The Phillips Library at the Peabody Essex Museum The Library maintains a collection of papers of the Andover Theological School (manuscript number E 6).
ATS profile for Andover Newton Theological School

Educational institutions established in 1807
Educational institutions established in 1965
Educational institutions established in 2017
Seminaries and theological colleges in Connecticut
Universities and colleges affiliated with the United Church of Christ
Seminaries and theological colleges affiliated with the American Baptist Churches USA
United Church of Christ in Connecticut
2017 establishments in Connecticut
Yale Divinity School